The Van Dorn battle flag is a historical Confederate flag with a red field depicting a white crescent moon in the canton and thirteen white stars; and trimmed with gold cord. In February, 1862, Confederate general Earl Van Dorn ordered that all units under his command use this flag as their regimental colors.  The 4th Missouri Infantry Regiment and 15th Arkansas Infantry Regiments carried this flag into battle, as well as some of Van Dorn's old units in the Army of Mississippi and East Louisiana.  

The thirteen stars in the Van Dorn battle flag reflect the thirteen states admitted to the Confederacy, including Kentucky and Missouri.

See also
Flags of the Confederate States of America
Missouri in the American Civil War

References

External links
 Confederate Flag History, website featuring Confederate Flag History, including an image of the Van Dorn battle flag

1862 introductions
1862 establishments in the Confederate States of America
Flags of the Confederate States of America